The Kemuning –Shah Alam Highway  (Malay: Lebuhraya Kemuning–Shah Alam), (LKSA), is an expressway in Klang Valley, Selangor, Malaysia. The  expressway connects Kemuning Interchange of the Shah Alam Expressway E5 near Kota Kemuning until Federal Highway Route 2 Interchange (also known as Bulatan Darul Ehsan Interchange) of the Federal Highway Route 2 near Klang.

Route background
The expressway starts at Kemuning Interchange and its interchange with the Persiaran Kota Kemuning and Shah Alam Expressway E5. After that, it passes the Jalan Bukit Kemuning Interchange, a toll plaza near Taman Sri Muda and Alam Impian Interchange. The expressway crosses the Klang River bridge to Section 24. The expressway overlaps with the Persiaran Sultan from Bulatan Jubli Perak Interchange towards Bulatan Selangor Interchange, Federal Highway Route 2 Interchange of the Federal Highway Route 2 and finally towards the Shah Alam city centre.

History
Construction of the expressway began in 2007. The expressway used to be known as Persiaran Sultan, and covers areas from Shah Alam city to Section 24. It was built at the Majlis Bandaraya Shah Alam (MBSA) (Shah Alam City Council) area and took 24 months to construct. It was completed in the middle of 2010. The expressway was opened to traffic on 18 May 2010.

Features
Linking Kota Kemuning to Shah Alam to Klang.
Straight and long expressway between Shah Alam city centre and Section 24.
An access route to Alam Impian.
A main route to the Shah Alam Expressway from Shah Alam and to the Federal Highway from Kota Kemuning.
Federal Highway Route 2 Interchange is the biggest cloverleaf interchange in Malaysia
The Touch 'n Go Drive-Through Purchase and Refill (POS) lane is provided here at all toll plazas along the highway.

Tolls
The Kemuning–Shah Alam Highway uses opened toll systems where all toll transactions at both toll plazas on the Kemuning–Shah Alam Highway are conducted electronically via Touch 'n Go cards or SmartTAGs starting 13 January 2016. Cash payments are no longer available. In October 2022, it was one of the four expressways maintained by PROLINTAS to have its toll rates deducted between 8% to 15%.

Toll rates
(Starting 20 October 2022)

Seri Muda toll plaza

Alam Impian toll plaza

List of interchanges

References

External links
Prolintas website
LKSA website

2010 establishments in Malaysia
Prolintas Expressway Networks
Expressways in Malaysia
Expressways and highways in the Klang Valley